Alex Monis (born March 20, 2003) is an American professional soccer player who plays as a forward for Major League Soccer club Chicago Fire.

Club career
Born in Downers Grove, Illinois, Monis began his career with the Chicago Fire youth academy before joining Chicago FC United. He then returned to the Chicago Fire in 2018.

Chicago Fire
On March 11, 2020, Monis signed a homegrown player deal with Major League Soccer club Chicago Fire.

Forward Madison (loan)
On July 24, 2020, Monis loaned USL League One club Forward Madison for the remainder of the 2020 season. He made his professional debut for the club a day later on July 25 against North Texas SC, coming on as a 74th minute in a 2–1 defeat.

International career
On May 15, 2019, Monis made his United States debut for the under-16s in a friendly against the Czech Republic.

Career statistics

References

External links
 Profile at Chicago Fire

2003 births
Living people
People from Downers Grove, Illinois
American soccer players
Association football forwards
Chicago Fire FC players
Forward Madison FC players
Major League Soccer players
USL League One players
Soccer players from Illinois
Homegrown Players (MLS)
MLS Next Pro players
Chicago Fire FC II players
Sportspeople from DuPage County, Illinois
American sportspeople of Filipino descent